The 2002 Asian Cycling Championships took place at Bangkok, Thailand from 4 to 10 May 2002.

Medal summary

Road

Men

Women

Track

Men

Women

Medal table

References

 Results

Asia
Asia
Cycling
Asian Cycling Championships
International cycle races hosted by Thailand